The 2022 Vermont Senate election took place on November 8, 2022, as part of the biennial United States elections. The election coincided with elections for other offices including the U.S. Senate, U.S. House, Governor, and State House. Vermont voters elected all 30 state senators from 16 districts, with each district electing between one and three senators. State senators serve two-year terms in the Vermont Senate. Primary elections were held on August 9, 2022. This election will be the first to use new districts adopted by the Vermont General Assembly to allocate for population changes across the state after the 2020 census.

Democrats and Progressives retained their combined 23-seat supermajority. Because Democrats and Progressives simultaneously won a supermajority in the Vermont House of Representatives for the first time ever, this meant that they could pass bills that were vetoed by Republican governor Phil Scott. Republicans lost one seat during redistricting, as Joe Benning's Caledonia County seat was eliminated, but they made up for this loss by gaining a seat from Democrats in Rutland County. Democrats still managed to have a net gain of one seat, as they won the newly created Chittenden North district and gained a seat from Progressives in Washington County. This left newly elected senator Tanya Vyhovsky as the only Progressive in the Senate, although four of the elected Democrats were also nominated by the Progressive Party and appeared on the ballot as "Democratic/Progressive."

Summary of results

Retiring incumbents
Ten incumbent senators (5 Democrats, 3 Republicans and both Progressives) had announced they would not seek reelection.

Caledonia: Joe Benning (R) (ran for Lieutenant Governor)
Chittenden: Christopher Pearson (P/D)
Chittenden: Michael Sirotkin (D)
Franklin: Corey Parent (R)
Rutland: Joshua Terenzini (R)
Rutland: Cheryl Hooker (D/P)
Washington: Anthony Pollina (P/D)
Windham: Becca Balint (D) (ran for U.S. House)
Windham: Jeanette White (D)
Windsor: Alice Nitka (D)

Leadership selection
With incumbent Democratic president pro tempore Becca Balint retiring to run for U.S. House, Democrats had to nominate a new candidate who would take the position in the event they retained their majority. Ahead of the November 13 leadership vote, Philip Baruth of Chittenden was running unopposed. Andrew Perchlik of Washington had expressed interest in running but decided against it, and told VTDigger that the president pro tempore election was "not much of a race." Kesha Ram Hinsdale of Chittenden and Senate Majority Leader Alison Clarkson of Windsor, who had been speculated as potential candidates by media, both said they would not run and endorsed Baruth's bid. Democrats retained their Senate majority and Baruth was unanimously elected as the new president pro tempore, becoming the second president pro tempore to caucus with both Democrats and Progressives after Tim Ashe. Additionally, Clarkson was reelected as Majority Leader and Perchlik was elected Majority Whip, succeeding the retiring Cheryl Hooker.

Detailed results

Addison

Elects two senators.
Incumbent Democrats Ruth Hardy, who has represented the district since 2019, and Christopher Bray, who has represented the district since 2013, are both running for re-election.

Democratic primary
Christopher Bray, incumbent senator
Ruth Hardy, incumbent senator

Republican primary
Lloyd Dike, nursing assistant and U.S. Army veteran (write-in)
Robert Burton, farmer and former U.S. Navy pilot (write-in)

Independents
Mason Wade, homesteader and candidate for this district in 2018 and 2020

General election

Bennington

Elects two senators.
Incumbent Democrats Dick Sears, who has represented the district since 1993, and Brian Campion, who has represented the district since 2015, are both running for re-election.

Democratic primary
Brian Campion, incumbent senator
Dick Sears, incumbent senator

Republican primary

General election

People who received three or more write-in votes include Gerald Malloy (7), Mary Morrissey (7), Christina Nolan (5), Donald Trump (5), and Ericka Redic (3).

Caledonia

Elects one senator.
Following statewide redistricting, the Caledonia district now only elects one senator instead of two. Incumbent Democrat Jane Kitchel, who has represented the district since 2005, is running for re-election. Incumbent Republican Joe Benning, who has represented the district since 2011, is retiring to run for Lieutenant Governor.

Democratic primary
Jane Kitchel, incumbent senator

Republican primary
J.T. Dodge, anti-carbon tax activist, former vice chair of the Vermont Libertarian Party, and Libertarian nominee for this district in 2020

General election

Chittenden Central

Elects three senators.
Following statewide redistricting, the former Chittenden district which elected six senators, was split up into three new districts Chittenden Central which elects three senators, Chittenden North which elects one senator, and Chittenden Southeast which also elects three senators. Incumbent Democrat Philip Baruth, who has represented the Chittenden district since 2011, is running for re-election here. Incumbent Progressive Christopher Pearson, who has represented the Chittenden district since 2017, is retiring.

Democratic primary
Andrew Brown, president of the Essex Junction Board of Trustees (withdrew, remained on ballot)
Dawn Ellis, member of the Vermont Human Rights Commission and candidate for this district in 2014 and 2016
Philip Baruth, incumbent senator
Martine Gulick, Burlington school board member
Erhard Mahnke, former president of the Burlington city council and candidate for this district in 2020
Tanya Vyhovsky, state representative

Independents
Infinite Culcleasure, community advocate and candidate for mayor of Burlington in 2018

General election

People who received three or more write-in votes include Kurt Wright (17), Erhard Mahnke (14), Irene Wrenner (14), Ericka Redic (11), Leland Morgan (6), Richard Mazza (5), Liam Madden (4), Miriam Berry (3), Gerald Malloy (3), and Thomas Chittenden (3).

Chittenden North

Elects one senator.
Following statewide redistricting, the former Chittenden district which elected six senators, was split up into three new districts Chittenden Central which elects three senators, Chittenden North which elects one senator, and Chittenden Southeast which also elects three senators. The new Chittenden North district has no incumbent.

Democratic primary
Brian Shelden, chair of Essex Democrats and former director of the Essex Economic Development Commission
Irene Wrenner, journalist and former Essex selectman

Republican primary
Leland Morgan, state representative

General election

Brian Shelden, the runner-up in the Democratic primary, received 21 write-in votes.

Chittenden Southeast

Elects three senators.
Following statewide redistricting, the former Chittenden district which elected six senators, was split up into three new districts Chittenden Central which elects three senators, Chittenden North which elects one senator, and Chittenden Southeast which also elects three senators. Incumbent Democrats Thomas Chittenden, who has represented the Chittenden district since 2021, Ginny Lyons, who has represented the Chittenden district since 2001, and Kesha Ram Hinsdale, who has represented the Chittenden district since 2021, are all running for re-election here. Incumbent Democrat Michael Sirotkin, who has represented the Chittenden district since 2014, is retiring.

Democratic primary
Thomas Chittenden, incumbent senator
Ginny Lyons, incumbent senator
Steve May, social worker, former Richmond and Bolton selectman, and candidate for this district in 2018 and 2020
Lewis Mudge, Charlotte selectman
Kesha Ram Hinsdale, incumbent senator

Republican primary

After nobody won the Republican nomination, two replacement candidates filed to run:

Dean Rolland, small business owner and candidate for this district in 2020
Rohan St. Marthe, video producer

General election

People who received three or more write-in votes include Lewis Mudge (10), Philip Baruth (3), Randy Brock (3), Gerald Malloy (3), and Christina Nolan (3).

Essex

Elects one senator.
Following statewide redistricting, the former Essex-Orleans district which elected two senators has been split up into the Essex and Oreans districts, which each elect one senator. Incumbent Republican Russ Ingalls, who has represented the Essex-Orleans district since 2021, is running for re-election.

Republican primary
Russ Ingalls, incumbent senator

Democratic primary

General election

People who received three or more write-in votes include Robert Starr (12), John Rodgers (9), J.T. Dodge (6), Joe Benning (5), Jane Kitchel (4), Brenda Siegel (4), Patrick Leahy (3), Brian Smith (3), and Peter Welch (3).

Franklin

Elects two senators.
Incumbent Republican Randy Brock, who has represented this district since 2017, is running for re-election. Incumbent Republican Corey Parent, who has represented this district since 2019, is retiring.

Republican primary
Randy Brock, incumbent senator
Robert Norris, state representative and former Franklin County Sheriff

Democratic primary
Pam McCarthy, former nonprofit executive, mother of state representative Mike McCarthy, and candidate for this district in 2018
Jessie Palczewski, small business owner

General election

Leland Morgan received three write-in votes.

Grand Isle

Elects one senator.
Incumbent Democrat Richard Mazza, who has represented this district since 1985, is running for re-election.

Democratic primary
Richard Mazza, incumbent senator

Republican primary
Stephen Bellows, landscaping contractor (also ran for governor)

General election

Lamoille

Elects one senator.
Incumbent Republican Richard Westman, who has represented this district since 2011, is running for re-election.

Republican primary
Richard Westman, incumbent senator

Democratic primary

General election

People who received three or more write-in votes include Lucy Rogers (9), David Yacovone (4), Gerald Malloy (3), Bernie Sanders (3), and Shap Smith (3).

Orange

Elects one senator.
Incumbent Democrat Mark MacDonald, who has represented this district since 2003, is running for re-election.

Democratic primary
Mark MacDonald, incumbent senator

Republican primary
John Klar, attorney, farmer, and candidate for Governor of Vermont in 2020

General election

Orleans

Elects one senator.
Following statewide redistricting, the former Essex-Orleans district which elected two senators has been split up into the Essex and Orleans districts, which each elect one senator. Incumbent Democrat Robert Starr, who has represented the Essex-Orleans district since 2005, is running for re-election here.

Democratic primary
Robert Starr, incumbent senator

Republican primary
Samuel Douglass, chair of Vermont Young Republicans

General election

Rutland

Elects three senators.
Incumbent Republican Brian Collamore, who has represented the district since 2015, is running for re-election. Incumbent Democrat Cheryl Hooker, who has represented the district since 2019, and incumbent Republican Joshua Terenzini, who has represented the district since 2021, are both retiring.

Republican primary
Brian Collamore, incumbent senator
Dave Weeks, national security expert and military veteran
Terry Williams, Poultney selectman and candidate for this district in 2020

Democratic primary
Joshua Ferguson, sailboat repairman (write-in)
Bridgette Remington, attorney
Anna Tadio, Rutland city councillor and vice chair of the Rutland County Democratic Party

General election

Washington

Elects three senators.
Incumbent Democrats Ann Cummings, who has represented the district since 1997, and Andrew Perchlik, who has represented the district since 2019, are both seeking re-election. Incumbent Progressive Leader Anthony Pollina, who has represented the district since 2011, is retiring.

Democratic primary
Ann Cummings, incumbent senator
Jared Duval, semiconductor manufacturing executive
Jeremy Hansen, Berlin selectman and Independent candidate for this district in 2012
Andrew Perchlik, incumbent senator
Anne Watson, mayor of Montpelier

Republican primary
Paul Bean
Dexter Lefavour, farmer, engineer, and candidate for this district in 2012 (write-in)
Dwayne Tucker, civil engineer and candidate for Lieutenant Governor of Vermont in 2020

General election

People who received three or more write-in votes include John Klar (36), Jared Duval (33), Jeremy Hansen (5), Richard Westman (4), Mark MacDonald (3), and Bernie Sanders (3).

Windham

Elects two senators.
Incumbent Democrat Senate President pro tempore Becca Balint, who has represented the district since 2015, is retiring to run for Congress. Incumbent Democrat Jeanette White, who has represented the district since 2003, is also retiring.

Democratic primary
Wichie Artu, farmer
Wendy Harrison, traveling municipal manager
Nader Hashim, former state representative

Republican primary
Mark Coester, logger (also running for U.S. Senate as an Independent)
Richard Kenyon, tax preparer
Richard Morton, chair of the Windham County Republican Party and nominee for Vermont State Treasurer in 2018 (also running for state auditor)

After winning the primary, Mark Coester filed to run as an Independent instead. The Windham County Republican Committee chose Richard Morton, the third-place primary finisher, to replace him as the second Republican on the general election ballot.

Independents
Mark Coester, logger
Tim Wessel, Brattleboro selectman

General election

Wichie Artu, the loser of the Democratic primary, received 20 write-in votes.

Windsor

Elects three senators.
Incumbent Democrats Alison Clarkson, who has represented the district since 2017, and Richard McCormack, who has represented the district since 2007, are both seeking re-election. Incumbent Democrat Alice Nitka, who has represented the district since 2007, is retiring.

Democratic primary
Alison Clarkson, incumbent senator
Richard McCormack, incumbent senator
Chris Morrow, former bookstore owner (withdrew, remained on ballot)
Rebecca White, state representative

Republican primary
Dana Colson, welding supplies company owner and candidate for Lieutenant Governor of Vermont in 2020
Alice Flanders, former teacher and retired U.S. Navy engineer
Bill Huff, retired pilot and nominee for the Orange district in 2020 (write-in, also running for state house)

General election

People who received three or more write-in votes include John Klar (11), Anna Tadio (4), Cris Ericson (3), Gerald Malloy (3), Chris Morrow (3), and David Zuckerman (3).

See also
2022 Vermont elections
2022 United States elections
2022 United States Senate election in Vermont
2022 United States House of Representatives election in Vermont
2022 Vermont gubernatorial election
2022 Vermont lieutenant gubernatorial election
2022 Vermont House of Representatives election

Notes

References

Senate
Vermont Senate
Vermont Senate elections